George David Hackney (born December 15, 1965) is an American attorney and politician who is a member of the Washington House of Representatives from the 11th district. Elected in 2020, he assumed office on January 11, 2021.

Early life and education 
Hackney was born in Cleveland, Ohio and lived in five states as a child. Hackney earned a Bachelor of Arts degree from Cornell University and Juris Doctor from Harvard Law School.  He was a member of Delta Kappa Epsilon and played football his freshman year.

Career 
After graduating from law school, Hackney worked as an attorney and activist. Hackney served as a prosecutor for the United States Department of Justice in California and taught trial advocacy through the United Nations. He later worked in human resources and employee relations at Amazon.

Prior to his 2020 election, Hackney served on the Washington State Human Rights Commission. In the 2020 Democratic primary for District 11 of the Washington House of Representatives, Hackney defeated Democratic incumbent Zack Hudgins. He assumed office on January 11, 2021. A political progressive, Hackney criticized Hudgins' moderate voting record during the primary campaign.

References 

African-American state legislators in Washington (state)
Politicians from Cleveland
Cornell University alumni
Harvard Law School alumni
Democratic Party members of the Washington House of Representatives
Washington (state) lawyers
Living people
1965 births
21st-century African-American people
20th-century African-American people
Delta Kappa Epsilon